Myristica sinclairii is a species of nutmeg. It is endemic to Papua New Guinea.

References

Flora of Papua New Guinea
sinclairii
Vulnerable plants
Taxonomy articles created by Polbot